Gulladurthy is a village located in Koilkuntla mandal of Kurnool district in Andhra Pradesh, India.

References

Villages in Kurnool district